Kern Valley State Prison (KVSP) is a  male-only state prison in Delano, California. Kern Valley is a Level IV Maximum Security institution, opened in June 2005 with a design capacity of 2,448 inmates.

As of July 31, 2022, Kern Valley was incarcerating people at 118.7% of its design capacity, with 2,907 occupants.

Notable inmates
 Juan Manuel Alvarez, serving 11 life sentences without possibility of parole for parking an SUV on the tracks causing a train collision that lead to 11 deaths and 177 injuries.

See also
 List of California state prisons

References

External links
 Kern Valley State Prison (KVSP) official website
 California Department of Corrections and Rehabilitation Official website
 Website for families of prisoners at KVSP

2005 establishments in California
Prisons in California

Buildings and structures in Kern County, California